Jenny's Adventure was a trawler and whaler in the 1780s to the very early 1800s.

Career
From 1784 to 1788 the Jenny's Adventure was in use as a whaler, going between Greenland and Whitby, under Mr Callender, and subsequently Greenland and Sunderland, under Mr Noble.

From 1793 to ? the Jenny's Adventure was in use as a merchant brig, traveling between Sunderland and Portsmouth, under multiple masters.

1784
On 6 August 1784, the Jenny's Adventure, Calendor, master, arrived at Whitby from Greenland, carrying five "fish" (whales).

1785
On 26 March 1785, the Jenny's Adventure, Callender, master sailed from Whitby to Greenland.

On 15 July 1785, the Jenny's Adventure had a full ship, of presumably 'fish', this information was passed to the Young Eagle from Greenland, who passed this along to a Captain Jackson, who passed this to the Grand Bay

On 17 July 1785 the Jenny's Adventure, Calender, master, arrived at Whitby from Greenland, carrying 8 'fish'

1786
On 30 March 1786, the Jenny's Adventure, Callender, master, sailed for Greenland.

On 18 July 1786, the Jenny's Adventure, Calender, master, arrived at Whitby from Greenland, carrying 7 'fish'.

1787
On 20 August 1787, the Jenny's Adventure, Noble, master, arrived at Sunderland from Greenland.

1788
On 8 August 1788, the Jenny's Adventure, Noble, master, arrived at Sunderland from Greenland, carrying 4 'fish'.

1793
On 20 July 1793, the Jenny's Adventure, Knags, master, arrived at Portsmouth from Sunderland.

On 2 August 1793, the Jenny's Adventure, Rigg, master, arrived at Portsmouth from Sunderland.

On 17 September 1793, the Jenny's Adventure, Shield, master, arrived at Portsmouth from Sunderland.

1800

Jenny's Adventure first appeared in the Register of Shipping (RS) in 1800 (the first year of its publication).

Fate
, of North Shields, sank Jenny's Adventure on 23 January 1806 when Broderick ran into Jenny's Adventure. Three of the crew of Jenny's Adventure died in the accident. Her entry in the RS volume for 1806 carried the annotation "LOST".

Citations and references
Citations

References
  

Whaling ships
Maritime incidents in 1806
Age of Sail merchant ships
Merchant ships of the United Kingdom